Harry Leonard Barnsley (17 March 1905 – 25 April 1969) was a British rowing coxswain. He competed in the men's coxed four event at the 1924 Summer Olympics.

References

External links
 

1905 births
1969 deaths
Date of death missing
British male rowers
Olympic rowers of Great Britain
Rowers at the 1924 Summer Olympics
Sportspeople from Chertsey
Coxswains (rowing)